Geoffrey Robert Hines (born 10 October 1960) is a former New Zealand rugby union player. A flanker, Hines represented Waikato at a provincial level, and was a member of the New Zealand national side, the All Blacks, in 1980. He played 12 matches on the tours of Australia and Fiji and North America and Wales, including a single international, against Australia at Sydney.

References

1960 births
Living people
Rugby union players from Tokoroa
New Zealand rugby union players
New Zealand international rugby union players
Waikato rugby union players
Sharks (Currie Cup) players
New Zealand expatriate sportspeople in South Africa
New Zealand expatriate rugby union players
Expatriate rugby union players in South Africa
Rugby union flankers